L'Hebdo Magazine or more commonly as Magazine was a French-language weekly magazine published in Beirut, Lebanon. It was launched in 1956. The magazine ceased publication in 2019 due to the low level of revenues.

References

1956 establishments in Lebanon
2019 disestablishments in Lebanon
Magazines published in Beirut
French-language magazines
Weekly magazines published in Lebanon
Defunct magazines published in Lebanon
News magazines published in Asia
Magazines established in 1956
Magazines disestablished in 2019